Cachoeiro Futebol Clube, commonly known as Cachoeiro, is a Brazilian football club based in Cachoeiro de Itapemirim, Espírito Santo state. They competed in the Copa do Brasil once.

History
The club was founded on January 9, 1916. Cachoeiro won the Campeonato Capixaba in 1948, and the Campeonato Capixaba Second Level in 2000. They competed in the Copa do Brasil in 2001, when they were eliminated in the First Round by Fluminense.

Achievements
 Campeonato Capixaba
 Winners (1): 1948
 Campeonato Capixaba (Second Level)
 Winners (1): 2000

Stadium
Cachoeiro Futebol Clube play their home games at Estádio Moreira Rebello. The stadium has a maximum capacity of 5,500 people.

References

Association football clubs established in 1916
Defunct football clubs in Espírito Santo
1916 establishments in Brazil